In igneous petrology, eutaxitic texture describes the layered or banded texture in some extrusive rock bodies. It is often caused by the compaction and flattening of glass shards and pumice fragments around undeformed crystals.

See also

References

Igneous rocks by texture